Jacob Jacobs (born Yakov Yakubovitsh) (January 2, 1890 – October 14, 1977), Yiddish theater and vaudeville director, producer, lyricist, songwriter, coupletist, character actor, comic born in Rosca (now Riska, Romania). In 1904 the family emigrated to the United States and Jacobs worked in a soda factory, later in a sheet-metal factory, and then learned tailoring.

In 1907 he joined the chorus in a vaudeville theater and he sang couplets on Sundays, when vaudeville plays could not be presented. The following year he was hired as a vaudeville actor. In 1911 he was in his first play, Leon Kobrin's Yankel Boyla at the Odeon theater. In 1912 he became director of the Lyric Theater in Brownsville (Brooklyn), and then a partner with Nathan Goldberg in the Lennox Theater in Harlem.

From 1926 to 1930 he was co-director of the National Theater, and subsequently the Prospect Theater in the Bronx. He wrote the music to his own couplets. He married Rebecca Treitler (Betty), daughter of the Yiddish theater director.

In 1932 he collaborated with composer Sholom Secunda on a Yiddish musical comedy, I Would If I Could. Although the show was not a great success, it did produce a song that become a #1 hit, Bei Mir Bistu Shein.

He wrote, composed and directed the Broadway show, "The President's Daughter" in 1970.

He is buried in Mount Hebron Cemetery, in the Yiddish Theatrical Alliance area.

References

External links
 Jacob Jacobs recordings at the Discography of American Historical Recordings.

1890 births
1977 deaths
Yiddish theatre
American people of Hungarian-Jewish descent
Hungarian Jews